Limonada cimarrona is a type of limeade, used as a "chaser" in Nicaragua, specially used with white dry rums, or local "guaro".  Instead of using plain water, soda water is used with lime juice (in Nicaragua, "limón" usually means lime) and with salt added to taste.

See also

 List of lemonade topics

References

Lemonade